José Pérides (born 18 April 1935) was a Portuguese footballer who played as midfielder.

Career 
Born in Tete, Portuguese Mozambique, Pérides gained 2 caps for Portugal, and made his debut on 8 October 1961 in Luxembourg City against Luxembourg, in a 4–2 defeat.

External links
 

1935 births
Living people
Portuguese footballers
Association football midfielders
Associação Académica de Coimbra – O.A.F. players
Sporting CP footballers
S.C. Covilhã players
S.L. Benfica footballers
Portugal international footballers
People from Tete Province